Highway 34  designates major roads intended for travel by the public between Highway 13 just to the west of Ogema to the US border. The highway used to connect to Montana Secondary Highway 511 at the Port of Big Beaver, however the port closed in 2011.  Saskatchewan's main roadways are located in the central/southern geographical land area of rugged badlands, and rolling prairie and grass land in a western Canadian prairie province.  This paved highway along with Red Coat Trail and  Outlaw Tail, early Red river cart trails encompassed the Big Muddy Badlands.

Communities
Communities  along route 34 travelling from south to north includes firstly, the Port of Big Beaver, a community on the United States - Canada border.  Big Beaver is a hamlet of about 21 people in southwestern Saskatchewan.  Bengough is a town of about 337 people in 2006.   Prairie South School Division No, 210 supports Bengough School which has about 180 students. This consolidated school K-12 supports children from rural areas via school bus. Bengough also is home to the SouthEast Regional College.  Route 34 passes near Glasnevin, which is an unincorporated area.

Rural municipalities
A list of rural municipalities that the route enters from south to north would begin with Happy Valley No. 10.  Happy Valley R.M. incorporated January 1, 1913  and serves 174 rural residents who live within its area encompassing 812.74 square kilometres.  Bengough No. 40 was also incorporated  January 1, 1913  serving  337 rural residents within its area encompassing  1,036.91 square kilometres.  Key West No. 70 was incorporated December 12, 1910, serves  309 residents in an area of  825.26 square kilometres.

Economics
Gas and oil exploration has resulted in large number of wells in the area. Coal mining, tourism and agriculture are the main economic mainstays of the area.

Nearby
St. Victor Petroglyphs and Grasslands National Park  are in the vicinity.
Bengough Regional Park offers Ball diamonds, horseshoe pitches, cook shack, swimming pool, paddle pool and whirlpool and golf course. Big Beaver Regional Park offers camping and picnic facilities.

History
The Big Muddy Badlands were home to outlaws such as Butch Cassidy, Sundance Kid, Sam Kelley and Dutch Henry which came to Canada, across the border to escape from the U.S. marshalls.
Bengough was the western terminus of the Radville - Bengough CNR rail line in 1924.  It is still situated on the CPR/CN Railway.  Glasnevin near the northern terminus of route 34 was located on the Assiniboia Branch CPR rail line.   This east–west route connected Weyburn and Altawan continuing westerly into Alberta to Manyberries.   These rail junctions and highways combined to serve communities and industries in the area.

Major attractions
Big Beaver Regional Park west of highway near Highway 18 intersection.  Big Muddy Badlands is a 55-km cleft (35 miles) long, 3.2-kilometre wide, and 160 metres (500 ft) deep valley of erosion and sandstone along Big Muddy Creek.  Big Muddy Lake lies to the west of highway 34.  Route 34 passes through the Missouri Coteau which is a plateau of low hummocky, undulating, rolling hills, potholes, and grasslands. Bengough Regional Park is west of highway 34 near Highway 705 19 km south of Bengough. Along this highway is Castle Butte a 60-metre (200 ft) high outcrop of sandstone and compressed clay which protrudes from the flat prairie.  Willow Bunch Lake is to the east of highway 34.  Channel Lake to west of highway near Highway 13

Nature
Travel along the big muddy area on route 34 may give glimpses of wildlife indigenous to the area.  Some may be Badger, Bobcat, Cottontail Rabbit, Coyote, gopher, Jack Rabbit, Lynx, Mule Deer, Pronghorn Antelope, Raccoon, Red Fox, Weasel, and White Tail Deer.

Major intersections

References

External links 
 Saskatchewan Highways Website—Highway Numbering 
 Saskatchewan Road Map RV Itineraries 
 Big Things of Canada, A Celebration of Community Monuments of Canada 

034